Miss International 1961, the 2nd Miss International was held on July 28, 1961 at the Long Beach Municipal Auditorium in Long Beach, California, United States. 52 contestants competed in the pageant. Stanny van Baer from Holland was crowned as Miss International 1961 by outgoing titleholder, Stella Marquez from Colombia.

Results

Placements

Special Awards

Preliminary Competition Winners

Contestants

  - Alicia Care
  - Rosemary Fenton
  - Iris Kosch
  - Jacqueline Oroi
  - Carmen Anze
  - Vera Maria Brauner Menezes
  - Hermione Clair Brown
  - Minnie Pu
  - Edna Dianne MacVicar
  - Kamala Athauda
  - Vilma Kohlgruber Duque
  - Jytte Nielsen
  - Elaine Ortega Hougen
  - Nicky Allen
  - Marja Ryönä
  - Brigitte Barazer de Lannurien
  - Ioanna Berouka
  - Ileana Polasek Alzamora
  - Stanny van Baer
  - Judy Chang
  - Sigrun Ragnarsdóttir
  - Diana Valentine
  - Irene Ruth Kane
  - Dalia Lion
  - Anna Vincenzini
  - Atsuko Kyoto
  - Lee Ok-ja
  - Eleanor Abi Karam
  - Elfie Klein
  - Ellysserre Ratahirisoa
  - Helen Tan Hong Lean
  - Monique Auglade
  - Leone Mary Main
  - Aase Marie Schmedling
  - Angela María Alcové
  - Gladys Fernández
  - Norma González Miranda
  - Pilar Arciaga
  - Ivette Monagas
  - Annie Carnie Jinks
  - Dina Maria Robbertse
  - Maria Del Carmen Cervera Fernández
  - Elizabeth Morena Oden
  - Michele Rossellat
  - Tahia Piehi
  - Dolly Ma
  - Aydan Demirel
  - Mónica Moore Davie
  - Jo Ann Marie Dyer
  - Gloria Lilue
  - Barbara Wilcock
  - Renate Moller

Withdrawals
  - Ramona Sanchez (disqualified after being determined to be Reona Herz, a 15-year-old American)
  - Julie Koh Moot-Lei (ill with hepatitis)

Notes

External links
Pageantopolis - Miss International 1961

1961
1961 in California
1961 beauty pageants
20th century in Los Angeles County, California